The 1992 Football League Cup final was a football match played on 12 April 1992 at Wembley Stadium, London, to determine the winner of the 1991–92 Football League Cup. The match was contested by Manchester United and Nottingham Forest. Manchester United won 1–0 to win the League Cup for the first time, with Brian McClair scoring the only goal.

Road to Wembley
As First Division clubs, both Manchester United and Nottingham Forest entered the League Cup in the second round. Both sides were drawn at home for the first leg, with Manchester United taking on Second Division Cambridge United and Nottingham Forest taking on Third Division Bolton Wanderers. Manchester United managed a 3–0 win in their first leg at Old Trafford, with goals from Ryan Giggs, Brian McClair and Steve Bruce, before an early goal from McClair set up a 1–1 draw at the Abbey Stadium. Meanwhile, Forest won 4–0 in their first leg match, before a 5–2 win in the second leg for a 9–2 aggregate score.

The two sides were again drawn at home in the third round, both against Second Division opposition. Manchester United beat Portsmouth 3–1 in their tie, with two goals from Mark Robins and one from Bryan Robson cancelling out John Beresford's goal for the visitors, while Forest beat Bristol Rovers 2–0. Home ties again awaited both teams in the fourth round, both against First Division opponents for the first time in the competition, with Manchester United beating Oldham Athletic 2–0 thanks to goals from McClair and Andrei Kanchelskis, while Forest could only manage a goalless draw against Southampton, before a 1–0 win in the replay at The Dell.

The quarter-final saw both teams drawn away for the first time in the competition, again against First Division opposition, with Manchester United beating local rivals Leeds United 3–1 at Elland Road, with goals from Clayton Blackmore, Kanchelskis and Giggs securing the victory after Leeds took an early lead through Gary Speed. This came just a week before Manchester United beat Leeds 1–0 at Elland Road in the third round of the FA Cup.

Nottingham Forest again needed a replay to make it into the semi-finals, following a 1–1 draw against Crystal Palace at Selhurst Park with a 4–2 win at the City Ground.

In the semi-finals, Manchester United drew Middlesbrough, the only Second Division side remaining in the competition, while Nottingham Forest were paired with Tottenham Hotspur, the FA Cup holders. Middlesbrough held Manchester United to a goalless draw in the first leg at Ayresome Park, and then forced extra time in the second leg at Old Trafford with a second-half goal from Bernie Slaven cancelling out Lee Sharpe's goal on the half-hour mark, before Ryan Giggs settled the tie just after the half-time break in extra time. Meanwhile, Forest drew 1–1 with Spurs in their first leg at the City Ground, before also requiring extra time to confirm a 2–1 victory at White Hart Lane.

Manchester United had not yet won the League Cup, losing in both of their previous appearances in the competition's final in 1983 and 1991.

Nottingham Forest, on the other hand, had won the competition four times between 1979 and 1990, equalling Liverpool's then-record number of victories in the competition. Forest had won the 1991–92 Full Members' Cup a fortnight prior and were hoping for a Football League cup double.

On the league scene, Manchester United were seriously challenging for the First Division title for the first time during Alex Ferguson's six seasons as manager, while Nottingham Forest were on course for another top 10 finish but had rarely looked like serious challengers since the 1983–84 season.

Match

Summary
The only goal of the game came in the 14th minute; after a long passing move by Manchester United, centre-back Gary Pallister played the ball midway inside the Nottingham Forest half to McClair, who laid it off to Giggs. Giggs then drove at the Forest defence, drawing defenders towards him and away from McClair in the centre. He then slid the ball sideways to McClair, who was able to dribble into the penalty area and shoot left-footed past Forest goalkeeper Andy Marriott into the bottom-right corner of the goal.

Details

Broadcasting
The match was broadcast live in the United Kingdom on ITV, with commentary from Brian Moore and Ian St John.

References

External links
Tournament results at RSSSF.com

1992
League Cup Final 1992
League Cup Final 1992
Final
Football League Cup Final
Football League Cup Final